Gerald "Jerry" Sheindlin (born November 19, 1933) is an American author, television personality, jurist and attorney. He spent many years as a trial judge serving the New York Supreme Court.

After serving in the Army during the Korean War, Sheindlin received a B.A. from Long Island University and a L.L.B from Brooklyn Law School, in 1959. He is the author of two books, Genetic Fingerprinting: The Law and Science of DNA Evidence and Blood Trail.

Following his career as a trial judge, Sheindlin became a television arbitrator when he replaced former New York City Mayor Ed Koch as the presiding judge on The People’s Court in the fall of 1999. This put him in competition with his wife Judith Sheindlin, a fellow former judge who presided over top-rated court show Judge Judy, which ran for 25 seasons from 1996 to 2021 and led to spin-off courtroom streaming series Judy Justice. Jerry presided over The People’s Court for the 1999–2000 season and most of the 2000–2001 season, after which he left the series and was replaced by Marilyn Milian.

Personal life 
He is married to Judy Sheindlin, better known as Judge Judy (so named after her court TV series). The two married in 1978, a second marriage for both. They were divorced in 1990, but they remarried in 1991. Sheindlin has 3 children (Gregory, Jonathan and Nicole), 2 stepchildren (Jamie and Adam Levy), and 13 grandchildren. Jonathan A. Sheindlin is a retinal surgeon and Greg, Adam and Nicole are lawyers.

References

External links
 

1933 births
Living people
New York Supreme Court Justices
Television judges
Writers from Greenwich, Connecticut
Writers from New York City
American male writers
20th-century American Jews
Brooklyn Law School alumni
21st-century American Jews